The Fifth Century is a classical and choral studio album by Gavin Bryars, conducted by Donald Nally, and performed by The Crossing choir with the saxophone quartet PRISM. This album was released in the label ECM New Series in November 2016. The album won the 2018 Grammy Award for Best Choral Performance.

Composition
The album is divided in two parts. The first seven tracks are a named after a setting of words by the theologian and poet Thomas Traherne, and performed by the choir and saxophone quartet at the Gould Hall in the Curtis Institute of Music in July 2014. The second part, named "Two Love Songs" is the last two tracks of the album are an a cappella settings for the women of The Crossing. It was recorded in June 2015 at Saint Paul's Episcopal Church in Philadelphia.

Reception
James Manheim in his review for All Music says that "He [Gavin Bryars] has not written much choral music, but this ECM release may make his fans wish he had written more." and about the production, he says that "As usual with ECM, the sound engineers are among the stars of the show; their work on The Fifth Century, at the Curtis Institute in Philadelphia, is especially enchanting."In The Guardian, Kate Molleson gave this album three stars and says that "the saxes weave around like extra voices and the blended sound of The Crossing and Prism is creamy and pliable" and Molleson add about the "Two love songs" part that it's "sung with a grace so chilly it might freeze at any moment."

Track listing
ECM New Series – ECM 2405 NS.

Personnel
The Crossing – choir
Donald Nally – conductor
John Grecia – piano
Prism Quartet:
Matthew Levy – tenor saxophone
Timothy McAllister – soprano saxophone
Taimur Sullivan – baritone saxophone
Robert Young – alto saxophone

References

ECM Records albums
ECM New Series albums
2015 albums
Albums produced by Manfred Eicher